David Cannon may refer to:

David Cannon (athlete) (born 1950), English long-distance runner
David Cannon (politician), member of the Idaho House of Representatives
David J. Cannon (1933–2011), American attorney
Whirlwind (comics), comic book villain with the real name David Cannon